Crevasse Crag is a jagged steep-sided prominence on the summit of a glaciated mountain ridge in the Lillooet Ranges of southwestern British Columbia, Canada.

The name of the peak was adopted on March 31, 1969 as submitted by climber Christian Adam. It is named after the large crevasse directly below its north ridge. Prior to its adoption in 1969, Crevasse Crag was climbed by Adam et al. on August 16, 1967.

Technically, Crevasse Crag is the remains of an extinct volcano that formed during the onset of Pemberton Belt volcanism 16 million years ago. This activity produced breccias, tuffs and plagioclase-phyric flows, all of which form the present day edifice of Crevasse Crag. Analyses of major, trace and rare-earth elements indicate that dacite, andesite and basaltic andesite lava flows form its lower flanks. These overlie Late Cretaceous and younger intrusive rocks that form the glaciated mountain ridge on which Crevasse Crag lies.

References

External links

Volcanoes of British Columbia
Two-thousanders of British Columbia
Pemberton Volcanic Belt
Subduction volcanoes
Miocene volcanoes
Extinct volcanoes
Lillooet Ranges
Polygenetic volcanoes
New Westminster Land District
Kamloops Division Yale Land District